Rinzin Dorji may refer to:

Rinzin Dorji, former Foreign Minister of Bhutan
Rinzin Dorji, last DagaPenlop under the second King Jigme Wangchuk and third King Jigme Dorji Wangchuk, grandfather of Lily Wangchuk 
Rinzin Dorji (athlete), runner